The 185th New York Infantry Regiment was an infantry regiment in the Union Army during the American Civil War.

Service
The 185th New York Infantry was organized August 26, 1864 at Syracuse, New York and mustered on September 19, 1864, for one-year service under the command of Colonel Edwin S. Jenney.

The regiment was attached to 1st Brigade, 1st Division, V Corps, Army of the Potomac, to May 1865.

The 185th New York Infantry mustered out of service May 30, 1865 in Washington, D.C. Veterans and recruits were transferred to the 5th New York Veteran Volunteer Infantry.

Detailed service
Left New York for Petersburg, Va., September 27, 1864. Siege of Petersburg, Va., October 1, 1864 to April 2, 1865. Boydton Plank Road, Hatcher's Run, October 27–28, 1864. Warren's Raid on Weldon Railroad December 7–12. Dabney's Mills, Hatcher's Run, February 5–7, 1865. Appomattox Campaign March 28-April 9. Lewis Farm, near Gravelly Run, March 29. Junction of Boydton and Quaker Roads March 29. White Oak Road March 31. Five Forks April 1. Pursuit of Lee April 3–9. Appomattox Court House April 9. Surrender of Lee and his army. March to Washington, D. C., May 1–12. Grand Review of the Armies May 23.

Casualties

The regiment lost a total of 98 men during service; 3 officers and 53 enlisted men killed or mortally wounded, 3 officers and 39 enlisted men died of disease.

Commanders

 Colonel Edwin S. Jenney - resigned February 3, 1865
 Colonel Gustavus Sniper

Notable members
 Private Adelbert Everson, Company D - Medal of Honor recipient for action at the Battle of Five Forks

See also

 List of New York Civil War regiments
 New York in the Civil War

References
 Clarke, H. Wadsworth. Roster of the 185th Regiment N.Y.V. (Syracuse, NY: s.n.), 1889.
 Dyer, Frederick H. A Compendium of the War of the Rebellion (Des Moines, IA: Dyer Pub. Co.), 1908.
 Wood, Jeffrey L. Under Chamberlain's Flag: The Stories of the 198th Pennsylvania Volunteers and the 185th New York Volunteers (Victoria, BC: Trafford), 2008. 
Attribution
 

Military units and formations established in 1864
Military units and formations disestablished in 1865
Infantry 185
1864 establishments in New York (state)
1865 disestablishments in Washington, D.C.